The 2018 UT Martin Skyhawks football team represented the University of Tennessee at Martin as a member of the Ohio Valley Conference (OVC) during the 2018 NCAA Division I FCS football season. Led by 13th-year head coach Jason Simpson, the Skyhawks compiled an overall record of 2–9 with a mark of 2–6 in conference play, placing eighth in the OVC. UT Martin played home games at Graham Stadium in Martin, Tennessee.

Previous season
The Skyhawks finished the 2017 season 6–5, 4–4 in OVC play to finish in fourth place.

Preseason

OVC media poll
On July 20, 2018, the media covering the OVC released their preseason poll with the Skyhawks predicted to finish in third place. On July 23, the OVC released their coches poll with the Skyhawks also predicted to finish in third place.

Preseason All-OVC team
The Skyahwks had three players selected to the preseason all-OVC team.

Offense

LaDarius Galloway – RB

Defense

James Gilleylen – LB

Specialists

Peyton Logan – KR

Schedule

Game summaries

at Missouri

at Middle Tennessee

Chattanooga

Austin Peay

at Murray State

Eastern Kentucky

at Eastern Illinois

Southeast Missouri State

at Jacksonville State

Tennessee Tech

at Tennessee State

References

UT Martin
UT Martin Skyhawks football seasons
UT Martin Skyhawks football